South Georgia is an island in the South Atlantic Ocean that is part of the British Overseas Territory of South Georgia and the South Sandwich Islands. The northern coast is indented with numerous bays and fjords, serving as good harbours.

Discovered by Europeans in 1675, South Georgia had no indigenous population due to its harsh climate and remoteness. Captain James Cook in  made the first landing, survey and mapping of the island, and on 17 January 1775 he claimed it a British possession, naming it "Isle of Georgia" after King George III. Through its history, it served as a whaling and seal hunting base, with intermittent population scattered in several whaling bases, the most important historically being Grytviken. The main settlement and the capital today is King Edward Point near Grytviken, a British Antarctic Survey research station, with a population of about 20 people.

History

The island of South Georgia was probably discovered in 1675 by Anthony de la Roché, a London merchant, and was named Roche Island on a number of early maps. It was sighted by a commercial Spanish ship named León operating out of Saint-Malo on 28 June or 29 June 1756. According to Argentine historians, it was explored on 29 June 1756, St Peter's Day, hence its Spanish name Isla San Pedro, literally "St Peter's Island".

The mariner Captain James Cook in  made the first landing, survey and mapping of South Georgia. As mandated by the Admiralty, on 17 January 1775 he took possession for Britain and renamed the island 'Isle of Georgia' for King George III.

After making a foot crossing of the island with Tom Crean and Frank Worsley, Ernest Shackleton organised the rescue of his party from Elephant Island following the disaster that befell the 1916 Imperial Trans-Antarctic Expedition, which he led. He is buried in the cemetery at Grytviken alongside Frank Wild.

Commercial sealing was conducted on the island between 1786 and 1913. During that period 131 sealing visits are recorded, eight of which ended when the vessel was wrecked. Modern industrial sealing associated with whaling stations was carried out between 1909 and 1964. Sealing era relics include iron try pots, hut ruins, graves and inscriptions, and the South Georgia Museum was established on the island in 1992.

Surveying by Carse
The island was surveyed by explorer Duncan Carse. He organised and led the South Georgia Survey of 1951–1957, surveying much of the interior of the island. Mount Carse and Carse Point are named after him. In 1961 he lived as a hermit in a remote part of South Georgia. Carse built a house at Ducloz Head on the southern coast of the island, intending to live there through the winter. However, in May, three months into the experiment, surge waves destroyed his camp. He managed to salvage enough gear to survive the winter until making contact with a ship 116 days later.

His knowledge and mapping proved helpful to the British during the Falklands conflicts.

Argentine occupation 

On 19 March 1982, a group of Argentinians arrived at Leith Harbour and raised the Argentine flag on the island. On 3 April, the second day of the Falklands War, Argentine naval forces occupied the island. South Georgia was retaken by British forces on 25 April during Operation Paraquet.

Geography and fauna

The island's climate is classified as an ET or polar tundra climate on the Köppen-Geiger classification system. It has no tree cover, and there is generally snow on the island during the winter months (April–November). The terrain is mountainous, with a central ridge and many fjords and bays along the coast. South Georgia is a breeding ground for elephant seals, fur seals, and king penguins. The island is home to the South Georgia pintail and the South Georgia pipit, the only known habitat for these birds.

There are 25 native vascular plants on South Georgia, and 76 non-native species have been recorded.

The island's topography includes a stepped sequence of flat surfaces interpreted as wave-cut platforms formed when sea level was higher relative to the island. At sea level strandflats have been described.

In 2013, teams of Norwegian government shooters and Sámi reindeer herders culled all 3,500 reindeer on the island. The animals had been introduced by Norwegian whalers in the early 20th century for food and sport hunting, but were later seen as a pest, damaging the island's flora and wider ecosystem. Karl Erik Kilander, the project manager, said the culled reindeer were frozen and taken to the Falkland Islands where they were sold to local residents and cruise ship operators.

In 2018, after a multiyear extermination effort, the island was declared free of invasive rodents and the number of South Georgia pipits had clearly increased.

The island lies in the path of large icebergs drifting northward from Antarctica. Iceberg A-38 grounded off the island in 2004, resulting in indirect but severe effects on local wildlife by disturbing life on the seafloor and blocking foraging routes of seals and penguins. In 2020, the colossal  Iceberg A-68, similar in size to the island itself, was initially believed to be on a similar collision course but broke apart before collision with the island.

See also 
 List of landforms of South Georgia
 Ryan Reef
 Storer Reef
 Sutton Crag
 Whalers Passage

References

Further reading 
 
 

 
Islands of South Georgia
Seal hunting